(1178-1225) was the last living member of the Taira clan. He was the son of Taira no Koremori, grandson of Taira no Shigemori, and great-grandson of Taira no Kiyomori. He and his brother, Taira no Takakiyo, were the only male members of the Taira clan to survive the Genpei War. His brother was executed in 1199, but Chikazane lived until 1225. His death marked the end of the Taira clan.

Oda Nobunaga claimed descent from him.

References
Utagawa Kunisada (Toyokuni III) - series and prints. Horst Graebner, Society for Japanese Arts. Accessed March 11, 2008.
 Taira no Chikazane

Daimyo
Taira clan